Noyers may refer to the following communes in France:

Noyers, Eure, in the Eure département
Noyers, Loiret, in the Loiret département 
Noyers, Haute-Marne, in the Haute-Marne département
Noyers, Yonne, in the Yonne département
Canton of Noyers, one of the former cantons of the Yonne department
Noyers-Auzécourt, in the Meuse département 
Noyers-Bocage, in the Calvados département 
Noyers-Pont-Maugis, in the Ardennes département
Noyers-Saint-Martin, in the Oise département 
Noyers-sur-Cher, in the Loir-et-Cher département
Noyers-sur-Jabron, in the Alpes-de-Haute-Provence département 
Noyers, Indre-et-Loir, a historic commune.

See also 
 Noyer, tree